Hasraf Dulull  is a British writer, director and producer.

Personal life
Hasraf Dulull (known as "Haz") was brought up in London, UK. He got his first computer at 16 and became a gamer, studying computer science, technology and design for his A Levels. He attended City, University of London (1998–2001), graduating with a BEng (2:1) in Media Communications, and creating a horror game for his dissertation.

Career
Dulull began his career as a CGI artist working on video games. In 2003 he started working for the Moving Picture Company, working his way up from compositor to VFX Supervisor on films such as 10,000 BC, Prince of Persia, The Chronicles of Narnia and The Dark Knight. Over the years he worked on numerous high-profile feature films, commercials, music promos and broadcast series such as Poldark and The Aliens on Channel 4. He has been nominated for several Visual Effects Society (VES) Awards for shows such as Planet Dinosaur (BBC) and America: The Story of Us (Discovery).

He began making short science fiction films such as Project Kronos, I.R.I.S and Sync. Project Kronos, made for just £3000 entirely with Adobe Creative Cloud applications. These went viral, leading to a deal to write, direct and co-produce his first feature film The Beyond with Armory Films and Benderspink. Ultimately, Dulull kept the film independent and it was released by Gravitas Ventures in late 2017. In 2018 he directed and co-produced his second film, 2036 Origin Unknown, starring Katee Sackhoff, based on his short story.

Along with Paula Crickard, he is the co-founder of Haz Film.

Dulull has cited his influences as Ridley Scott, James Cameron, Steven Spielberg, John Carpenter, and the Wachowskis.

Writing and directing credits

References

External links
HaZ Film

Hasraf HaZ Dulull on Vimeo

Living people
British film producers
Year of birth missing (living people)